Ann Marie Hayes is a camogie player. She won camogie All Star awards in 2004, 2009 and 2011, and played in the 2008, 2010 and 2011 All Ireland finals. She was an All-Star nominee in 2010 and a member of the Team of the Championship for 2011.

Other awards
Senior Gael Linn Cup 2008, Junior Gael Linn Cup 2007, All Ireland Intermediate 2004, Junior All Ireland 2003, All Ireland Minor 2000, three Schools Connacht medals, one School Football Connacht medal, one Ashbourne Shield medal.

References

External links
 Official Camogie Website
 Galway Camogie website
 Review of 2009 championship in On The Ball Official Camogie Magazine
 https://web.archive.org/web/20091228032101/http://www.rte.ie/sport/gaa/championship/gaa_fixtures_camogie_oduffycup.html Fixtures and results] for the 2009 O'Duffy Cup
 All-Ireland Senior Camogie Championship: Roll of Honour
 Video highlights from Galway's 2009 championship matches against Kilkenny and Wexford.
 Video highlights of 2009 championship Part One and part two
 Reports of 2008 All Ireland final in Independent, Irish Times Examiner, Reaction in Examiner
 Video highlights of 2008 championship Part One, Part Two and Part three
 Video of 2008 All Ireland finals preview
 Video of 2008 All Ireland semi-final Wexford v Galway

Year of birth missing (living people)
Living people
Galway camogie players